Deborah Ross (née Koff; June 20, 1963) is an American lawyer and politician who has served as the U.S. representative for  since 2021. Her district is based in Raleigh. A member of the Democratic Party, Ross served as a member of the North Carolina House of Representatives from 2003 to 2013, representing the state's 38th and then 34th House district, including much of northern Raleigh and surrounding suburbs in Wake County.

Ross was the Democratic nominee in the 2016 U.S. Senate election in North Carolina, unsuccessfully challenging Republican incumbent Richard Burr in the general election.

Early life and education 
Ross was born in Philadelphia, Pennsylvania, on June 20, 1963, and grew up in Connecticut. She is the daughter of Barbara (née Klein) and Marvin Koff. Her father served as a physician in the Air Force during the Vietnam era and her mother taught preschool.

Ross earned her Bachelor of Arts degree from Brown University in 1985 and her Juris Doctor from the University of North Carolina School of Law in 1990.

Legal career 
After graduating from law school, Ross worked for Raleigh-based Hunton and Williams as a tax litigator and municipal bond lawyer. She taught at Duke Law School as a senior lecturing fellow.

American Civil Liberties Union 
Ross was hired as state director for the American Civil Liberties Union (ACLU) of North Carolina in 1994. She worked on First Amendment and juvenile justice issues. Alongside Governor Jim Hunt and then State Senator Roy Cooper, she overhauled North Carolina's system for dealing with youth offenders. In response to racial profiling reports, she also successfully encouraged state police agencies to collect race-based statistics for traffic stops. Ross stepped down from her position at the ACLU in 2002 when she launched her state House campaign.

GoTriangle 
On May 1, 2013, Ross announced she would resign from the legislature in June  to serve as legal counsel for GoTriangle, the triangle area's regional transit agency. On June 1, 2013, Grier Martin was appointed to succeed her in the House.

Smith Moore Leatherwood LLP 

In March 2017, Ross joined the regional law firm of Smith Moore Leatherwood LLP in Raleigh. Her practice focused on the economic development, energy, utilities, and infrastructure needs of businesses and government. Smith Moore Leatherwood combined with national law firm Fox Rothschild, LLP, on November 1, 2018.

Early political career

North Carolina legislature 
Ross was first elected to the North Carolina General Assembly in 2002 and defeated Wake County Commissioner Phil Jeffreys in 2004 to win a second term. She faced no opposition in the 2006 general election, and in 2007, Ross was first elected as one of the House Democratic Whips.

Ross supported the Equal Pay Act, an unsuccessful bill that would have banned North Carolina employers from paying workers differently based on gender.

In 2012, Ross compared state coastal protection policies that ignore scientists' sea level rise forecasts to burying one's "head in the sand". She said she was concerned that increased risk of flooding would lead insurance companies to charge higher premiums for coastal property owners.

2016 U.S. Senate campaign 

In 2015, Ross resigned as legal counsel at GoTriangle to run for the U.S. Senate in 2016. She won the March 2016 Democratic primary with 62.4% of the vote from a field of four candidates. Ross was endorsed by EMILY's List, Planned Parenthood, the North Carolina Association of Educators, the North Carolina AFL–CIO, American Association for Justice, End Citizens United, the Democratic Senatorial Campaign Committee, Democracy for America, and the League of Conservation Voters.

In the general election, Ross ran against the incumbent, Republican Richard Burr. Ross raised more money than Burr for three consecutive quarters, but nevertheless had less cash on hand as Burr began the year with $5.3 million in campaign funds. As of October 21, Ross was down 2.8% in the Real Clear Politics average of polls. The race received national attention as The Cook Political Report rated the race a toss-up and Democrats viewed the seat as one they could win. Burr won with 51% of the vote.

U.S. House of Representatives

Elections

2020 

On December 2, 2019, Ross announced her candidacy for the U.S. House of Representatives in North Carolina's newly redrawn 2nd congressional district in 2020. She jumped into the race shortly after a court-ordered redistricting cut the 2nd back to southern Wake County, including almost all of Raleigh. The old 2nd covered roughly half of Wake County, along with several exurbs south and east of the capital.

Had the district existed in 2016, Hillary Clinton would have carried it with 60% of the vote and defeated Donald Trump by over 24 points. By comparison, Trump carried the old 2nd with 53% of the vote, defeating Clinton by 12 points. On paper, the new map turned the 2nd from a Republican-leaning district into a safely Democratic district.

With pundits suggesting that the 2nd was a likely Democratic pickup, Republican incumbent George Holding, who had represented much of the area for two terms in the 13th district before it was essentially merged with the 2nd in 2016, opted to retire. Holding said that the significantly bluer hue of the new 2nd figured significantly in his decision.

Ross won the Democratic primary on March 3. She won the general election on November 3, defeating Republican nominee Alan Swain and Libertarian Jeff Matemu.

Tenure
As of December 2021, Ross had voted in line with Joe Biden's stated position 100% of the time. On July 1, 2021, Ross and Mariannette Miller-Meeks introduced the America's CHILDREN Act. If enacted, the bill would grant a pathway to permanent residency for children who grew up in the United States legally but were blocked from obtaining permanent residency due to green card backlogs and other legal barriers.

Committee assignments 
 Committee on the Judiciary
 Subcommittee on Courts, Intellectual Property and the Internet
Committee on Rules
Committee on Science, Space and Technology
Subcommittee on Energy
Subcommittee on Research and Technology

Caucus memberships 
New Democrat Coalition
 Democratic Women’s Caucus

Personal life
Ross and her husband, Steve Wrinn, live in a home that they restored in Boylan Heights, a historic neighborhood in Raleigh.

Ross is one of three Unitarian Universalists in Congress.

See also
Women in the United States House of Representatives

References

External links

Representative Deborah Ross official U.S. House website
Deborah Ross for Congress campaign website
 

|-

|-

|-

|-

1963 births
20th-century American lawyers
21st-century American politicians
21st-century American women politicians
20th-century American women lawyers
Candidates in the 2016 United States Senate elections
Democratic Party members of the United States House of Representatives from North Carolina
Female members of the United States House of Representatives
Lawyers from Philadelphia
American Unitarian Universalists
Living people
Democratic Party members of the North Carolina House of Representatives
North Carolina lawyers
Politicians from Philadelphia
University of North Carolina School of Law alumni
Women state legislators in North Carolina
Brown University alumni
American Civil Liberties Union people
Duke University School of Law faculty